Elsa Britt Madeleine Olefjord Widding (born 24 January 1968 in Gothenburg) is a Swedish politician, energy specialist, author and commentator.

She was an advisor to the Swedish government on energy and infrastructure issues, and gained public notice in 2009 for her opposition to the state-run energy company Vattenfall buying out Dutch energy company Nuon due to the financial consequences of the decision which became known as the Nuon affair. Since the 2022 Swedish general election, she has been a member of the Riksdag for the Stockholm County constituency as a member of the Sweden Democrats.

Biography

Education and professional work
Widding holds a master's degree in engineering and environmental sciences from Chalmers University of Technology which she gained in 1993 and then a degree in business from INSEAD. She worked in the energy sector, first for the Norwegian energy supplier Statkraft and then for various positions at Vattenfall. Between 2008 and 2010, she was a government advisor to Sweden's Ministry of Enterprise, Energy and Communications and since 2014 has been a private consultant to energy companies.

Commentary and views
Widding gained some public prominence in Sweden in 2009 for opposing Vattenfall's buyout of Dutch energy company Nuon (now known as Vattenfall Nederland). Widding argued that Vattenfall would see a financial loss following the takeover and wrote to Vattenfall's then CFO Dag Andresen warning about the deal and stated that, in order to meet its return requirements, Vattenfall should pay a maximum of 70 billion kronor. After the deal, Vattenfall was forced to heavily write down the value of Nuon, which drastically worsened Vattenfall's finances. Vattenfall former CEO Lars Westerberg later testified that Widding had been right in her prediction.

In 2015, she wrote in an article for Svenska Dagbladet criticizing Vattenfall's involvement in winding down coal power in Germany, which she stated was too short-term. She argued Sweden should "put on the leader's jersey and instead of shirking responsibility and just selling the coal power plants, find a way to speed up the conversion of these so that they can run them fossil-free within a reasonable time." In 2019, she campaigned against Sweden's proposal to close down some of its nuclear power plants in favour of wind energy.

During her career, Widding began sharing her commentary regarding energy and climate change on her personal YouTube channel and on articles for the Klimatrealistern blogsite, the latter of which has been described as expressing climate change scepticism. Widding has stated that she is not a climate change denier and supports increased use of renewable energy and environmental protection, but has claimed climate change activism has promoted alarmist messages presented by the media that Widding claims are highly misleading to both decision-makers and the public. For her views, she was named "Sweden's rowdiest woman" by Passion For Business magazine.

Politics
For the 2022 Swedish general election, Widding stood as a candidate for the Sweden Democrats party in the Stockholm County constituency and was elected to the Riksdag.

See also 

 List of members of the Riksdag, 2022–2026

References 

1968 births
Living people
Members of the Riksdag from the Sweden Democrats
Women members of the Riksdag
21st-century Swedish women politicians
Swedish engineers
Swedish YouTubers
21st-century Swedish politicians
Chalmers University of Technology alumni
Members of the Riksdag 2022–2026